The 1951 PGA Championship was the 33rd PGA Championship, held June 27 to July 3 at Oakmont Country Club in Oakmont, Pennsylvania, a suburb northeast of Pittsburgh. Sam Snead won the match play championship, 7 & 6 over Walter Burkemo in the Tuesday final; the winner's share was $3,500 and the runner-up's was $1,500.

It marked the first time the PGA Championship returned to a venue; Oakmont had hosted in 1922 (at the time, it had also hosted two U.S. Opens and three U.S. Amateurs). It was the third and final win for Snead in the PGA Championship, and the fifth of his seven major titles. At age 39, he was the oldest at the time to win the PGA Championship, passing his old record of two years earlier. Burkemo won the title in 1953 and was runner-up again in 1954.

Defending champion Chandler Harper lost in the first round to Jim Turnesa in a match that went to 23 holes. Turnesa, the runner-up to Snead back in 1942, won the title following year in 1952, and displaced Snead as the oldest champion by a few months.

Snead's win was the last by a former champion for twenty years, until Jack Nicklaus won his second PGA Championship in 1971.

Claude Harmon, Lloyd Mangrum, and Pete Cooper tied for the lowest score in the stroke play qualifier at 142 (−2). Harmon won the $250 medalist prize on the third hole of a sudden-death playoff.

The British Open in 1951 was held in the first week of July in Northern Ireland. Its mandatory two-day qualifier was held the same days as the PGA's semifinals and finals, which prevented participation in both events.

Format
The match play format at the PGA Championship in 1951 called for 12 rounds (216 holes) in seven days:
 Wednesday and Thursday – 36-hole stroke play qualifier, 18 holes per day;
defending champion Chandler Harper and top 63 professionals advanced to match play
 Friday – first two rounds, 18 holes each
 Saturday – third round – 36 holes
 Sunday – quarterfinals – 36 holes
 Monday – semifinals – 36 holes
 Tuesday – final – 36 holes

Past champions in the field

Failed to qualify

Runyan did not advance in the six-way playoff for the one final spot in the match play field.
Source:

Final results

Final eight bracket

Source:

Final match scorecards
Morning

Afternoon

{|class="wikitable" span = 50 style="font-size:85%;
|-
|  style="background:Red;  width:10px;"|
|Eagle
|  style="background:Pink; width:10px;"|
|Birdie
|  style="background:PaleGreen; width:10px;"|
|Bogey
|    style="background:Green; width:10px;"|
|Double bogey
|}
Source:

References

External links
PGA Media Guide 2012
PGA.com – 1951 PGA Championship

1951
1951 PGA Championship
1951 in golf
1951 in American sports
1951 in sports in Pennsylvania
June 1951 sports events in the United States
July 1951 sports events in the United States